Hikmat ("wisdom") may refer to: 

 Hikmat (name)
 Bait al Hikmat, main library at Hamdard University, Karachi, Pakistan
 Divani-hikmat, literary council of Azerbaijan
 Hikmah (also transliterated Hikmat) Islamic term meaning "wisdom" or underlying philosophy of an Islamic law

See also
 Hikmet